Pleasant Grove was a municipality that held community status in Prince Edward Island, Canada. It was incorporated in 1980. On September 28, 2018, it was merged into the municipality of North Shore.

See also 
List of communities in Prince Edward Island

References 

Communities in Queens County, Prince Edward Island
Former rural municipalities in Prince Edward Island
Populated places disestablished in 2018